The 2017 Women's East Asia Cup was a Twenty20 (T20) cricket tournament, which was held in Hong Kong in September 2017. The venues for the round-robin stage matches were the Hong Kong Cricket Club in Wong Nai, and the Mission Road Ground in Mong Kok. The tournament was completed with the final and third-place play-off, which were played at the Kowloon Cricket Club.

The Twenty20 East Asia Cup is an annual competition featuring China, Hong Kong, Japan and South Korea that was first played in 2015 and alternates annually between a men's and women's event. China were the defending women's champions, having won the inaugural edition in 2015 at the Yeonhui Cricket Ground in Incheon, South Korea. South Korea had won the inaugural men's edition in 2016. Matches did not have Twenty20 International status.

Hong Kong defeated Japan in the final on 24 September 2017 to win the Women's East Asia Cup for the first time.

Squads

Round-robin

Points table

Matches

Play-offs

Third-place play-off

Final

References

External links
 Series home at ESPN Cricinfo

International cricket competitions in 2017–18
2017 Women's Twenty20 East Asia Cup